Richard Horne (died 1394), of Britford, Wiltshire was an English politician.

He was a Member (MP) of the Parliament of England for Wiltshire in September 1388.

References

Year of birth missing
1394 deaths
English MPs September 1388
People from Wiltshire